Doel is a village in northern Belgium.

Doel may also refer to:

 Doel (computer), a laptop for students in Bangladesh
 Doel Nuclear Power Station, Belgium

People
 Frances Doel, screenwriter
 Frank Doel (1908–1968), antiquarian bookseller famed for 84 Charing Cross Road